Tudorache is a Romanian surname. Notable people with the surname include:

Dragoș Tudorache (born 1975), Romanian politician
Marin Tudorache (born 1968), Romanian footballer
Paula Tudorache (born 1998), Romanian artistic gymnast
Vlad Tudorache (born 1995), Romanian footballer
Dany Tudorache (born 2001), Romanian Gesu

Romanian-language surnames